Drinić (Serbian Cyrillic: Дринић) is a village and seat of the municipality of Petrovac, Republika Srpska, Bosnia and Herzegovina and is also located partly in the municipality of Bosanski Petrovac.

Demographics 
According to the 2013 census, its population was 342 in the municipality of Petrovac and 3 in the municipality of Bosanski Petrovac.

References

Populated places in Petrovac, Bosnia and Herzegovina
Populated places in Bosanski Petrovac